Global Franchise Group was a brand-acquisition and management firm headquartered in Atlanta, Georgia, United States. It specialized in franchising and quick-service restaurant industries. It was founded in 2010 with the acquisition of NexCen Brands' properties and was acquired by FAT Brands in July 2021.

Global Franchise Group operated more than 1,400 franchised and corporate stores in 14 countries. The organization's mission was to "Champion Brands and the People Who Build Them".

History

November 2006: Acquired The Athlete's Foot, a franchised athletic footwear and apparel retail brand
February 2007: Acquired:
Bill Blass Limited, a classic American fashion brand
MaggieMoo's
Marble Slab Creamery
May 2007:  Acquired Waverly (founded in 1923), a  fashion and lifestyle brand in the home category. Its brand family includes Waverly, Waverly Home, Waverly Home Classics, Waverly Baby, and Waverly Sun N Shade.
August 2007: Pretzel Time and Pretzelmaker, two franchised brands in the hand-rolled pretzel category, were acquired from Mrs. Fields.
November 2007: Acquired Shoebox New York, a multibrand retailer for footwear, handbags, and accessories
January 2008:  Acquired Great American Cookies from Mrs. Fields.
September 2008: Waverly sold to Iconix Brand Group
December 2008: Bill Blass sold to Peacock International Holdings
July 2010: NexCen properties sold to Global Franchise Group
July 2012: Global Franchise Group sold The Athlete's Foot to Intersport, LLC
August 2014: Global Franchise Group acquired Hot Dog on a Stick from bankruptcy
September 2017: Global Franchise Group acquired Round Table Pizza.
July 2021: Global Franchise Group acquired by FAT Brands.

References

External links

Global Franchise Group
NexCen Brands
Fat Brands Inc

Companies based in Atlanta
Restaurant groups in the United States
Restaurants established in 2010
American companies established in 2010
2021 mergers and acquisitions